Taomiao is a town in  Juye County in southwestern Shandong province, China, located on the boundary between the prefecture-level cities of Heze and Zaozhuang. , it has 41 villages under its administration.

See also 
 List of township-level divisions of Shandong

References 

Township-level divisions of Shandong